is a retired Japanese figure skater. She is the 1989 World champion and the 1992 Olympic silver medalist. She is the first woman to land a triple-triple jump combination and a triple Axel in competition. At the 1988 Calgary Olympics, she became the first woman to land seven triple jumps in an Olympic free skating competition. She is widely recognised as one of the best figure skaters of all time.

Career
Ito started skating at age four at a rink in Nagoya and approached Machiko Yamada, who would become her coach throughout her career, on the same day. She landed her first triple jump at age 8. She went to live with her coach after her parents' divorce when she was 10.

Ito made her first appearance at a major international competition at the 1981 World Junior Championships. She placed 20th in the compulsory figures but won the free skating with a triple loop, a triple salchow, and two triple toe loop combinations. She finished 8th in the overall standings. At this event, the 11-year-old Ito was only 3'11" tall and weighed 53 pounds. She was nicknamed the "Jumping Flea" due to her diminutive size and powerful jumps.

At the 1982 World Junior Championships, Ito won both the short program and free skating, but again weak compulsory figures kept her off the podium, in 6th place overall. Her free skating at this event included a triple flip and a triple toe loop-triple toe loop combination, and she landed a triple Lutz in the exhibition.

Ito did not compete at the 1983 World Junior event, which took place in December 1982, after having sustained a broken ankle earlier that year. In the fall of 1983, she made her senior international debut at the Ennia Challenge Cup in the Netherlands, a competition that featured the short program and free skating only, without compulsory figures. She finished second to Katarina Witt, who went on to win the Olympic title a few months later. Ito's free skating included six triple jumps—flip, Lutz, loop, Salchow, and two toe loops—and she also completed a double loop-triple loop combination in the short program. At the 1984 World Junior Championships, she won both the short program and free skating but finished third overall due to a low placement in the compulsory figures. Ito also competed at the 1984 World Championships, where she finished 7th.

Ito won her first national championship in the 1985 season, but was unable to compete at that year's World Championships after again breaking her ankle. From that time on, she increased the number of triple jumps she would attempt in the free skating. From 1985 to 1987, Ito's free skating included seven triple jumps, but she would not always perform them cleanly. She would attempt a triple toe loop-triple toe loop combination, a Lutz jump, a flip jump, a loop jump, a Salchow jump in combination and another solo Salchow jump.

Ito placed 5th at the 1988 Winter Olympics in Calgary, Alberta, Canada. In Calgary, she performed a double loop-triple loop in the short program, and seven triples in the free skating: Lutz, flip, double Axel-half loop-triple Salchow combination, loop, triple toe loop-triple toe loop combination, and another Salchow. She received the best technical scores given, two 5.8 and seven 5.9 marks, despite skating before the final flight. Her successful seven triple jumps were two more than any of the other skaters even attempted. Later that same year, she perfected the triple Axel, which she had been working on since her early teens, and landed it at a regional competition in the Aichi Prefecture. She became the first woman to land it in international competition at the 1988 NHK Trophy. She then repeated the feat at the World Championships in 1989. Ito thus became the first woman to execute all six possible triple jumps in World competition: Axel, Lutz, flip, loop, Salchow, and toe loop. She was 6th in the compulsory figures but made up for it. She won the gold medal with a flawless free skating when she received 6.0s for technical merit from five of the nine judges, receiving 5.9s from the rest. Her win at the 1989 World Championships was the first world title in the sport for an Asian competitor.

During the start of the 1989–90 season, Ito made history again at the 1989 NHK Trophy competition, where she received a rare 6.0 technical/6.0 artistic score from the Hungarian judge, and again landed seven triples, including the triple Axel. At the 1990 World Championships, Ito was 10th after the compulsory figures but placed first in both the short program and the free skating and won the silver medal, second to Jill Trenary. She landed seven triple jumps in the free skating, including the triple Axel. Compulsory figures were eliminated from competitions following that season. Ito commented: "In training, I spend about two-thirds of my time on the figures. So I will sort of miss them as part of my life. But I will not miss them in the actual event." In June 1990, she was invited to meet Emperor Akihito.

Ito had chronically sore knees due to her jumps. In February 1991, she underwent surgery to remove two glandular cysts in her throat and was in the hospital for 18 days. In March, at the 1991 World Championships, Ito collided with France's Laetitia Hubert during a practice session – her hip and the top of her foot were bruised. In the short program, she placed her jump combination too close to the corner of the rink and fell into the opening in the boards for the television camera but was back on the ice within seconds. She finished 4th at the event.

At the 1991 Grand Prix International de Paris – a pre-Olympic event in Albertville – Ito beat Kristi Yamaguchi by completing a triple Axel and five other triple jumps in her free skating. During the warm-up before the free skating, she landed a triple Axel-triple toe loop jump combination.

The 1992 Winter Olympics did not include the compulsory figures which caused Ito to lose the World championships the year before even after winning the short program and free skating competitions. With only the short program and the free skating to perform, she became the heiress apparent to Katarina Witt. She planned to perform the triple Axel combined with a double toe loop for the jump combination requirement in the short program but changed it to a triple Lutz combination. Ito placed fourth in the short program when she fell on her triple Lutz jump. In comparison, Kristi Yamaguchi and Nancy Kerrigan completed their triple Lutz-double toe loop combinations and then placed one and two, respectively. The change may have an interesting origin. During a practice session, Surya Bonaly of France performed a back flip near her. Ito was nearly hit on the head and was obviously shaken. Subsequently, her practice with her triple Axel jumps turned out poorly, which may have led her to take it out of the original program. Ito's free skating began with a failed triple Axel but she attempted it again at the end of her program and landed it successfully, becoming the first woman to land one in the Olympics. She won the silver medal, and apologized to her country for not winning the gold. Ito turned professional afterwards, bringing the triple Axel for the first time to the professional ranks, and performed with ice shows in Japan. She briefly returned to competitive skating in the 1995–96 season, but without her former success.

During the peak of her career, Ito performed much the same jump content as the top male skaters of the time. She was the first ladies' skater to perform a triple-triple jump combination and the first to perform the triple Axel. In March 1990, Jill Trenary said, "I was in awe of how high she jumps." In 1990, Scott Hamilton said "it will be 50 years before we see anything like Midori Ito again," and Toller Cranston, the same year, noted that "she is beyond 6.0."

Ito lit the Olympic flame during the opening ceremonies of the 1998 Winter Olympics.

Ito returned to competitive figure skating in 2011. She competed at the ISU Adult Figure Skating Competition and placed second in her category, Ladies' Masters Elite II. Ito repeated her second-place finish the following year. In 2013, on her third year competing at the ISU Adult Figure Skating Championship, she took the title with a 12 points margin over the second place.

Programs

Post–2010

Pre-1996

Results

Records and achievements

Amateur
 First World Champion from an Asian country (1989).
 First woman to land a triple-triple jump combination (1981).
 First woman to land a double loop-triple loop combination (in the short program) (1983).
 First woman to land five different triple jumps in competition (1983).
 First woman to land a triple Axel in competition (1988).
 First woman to land six different triple jumps in competition (1989).
 First woman to land a triple Axel in the Olympics (1992).

Awards
 Inducted into the World Figure Skating Hall of Fame (2003).

Triple Axel
Ito landed 18 triple Axels in competition.

Media appearances

DVD
 伊藤みどりのフィギュアスケート・ライフ努力編 (2006) – 
 伊藤みどりのフィギュアスケート・ライフ人生編 (2007) – 
 伊藤みどりのフィギュアスケート・ライフ (2007) –

Book
 タイム・パッセージ―時間旅行（1993）- 
 伊藤みどり物語 (1992) – 
 氷上の宝石―伊藤みどり写真集 (1993) –

In other media
 She is briefly seen in the film I, Tonya (2017) played by actress Fi Dieter in an uncredited role.

References

External links

 Green – Midori Ito Official Blog 
 Midori Ito fan site, including extensive biography and pictures

Japanese female single skaters
Figure skaters at the 1988 Winter Olympics
Figure skaters at the 1992 Winter Olympics
Olympic figure skaters of Japan
Olympic silver medalists for Japan
Figure skaters from Nagoya
1969 births
Living people
Olympic cauldron lighters
Olympic medalists in figure skating
World Figure Skating Championships medalists
World Junior Figure Skating Championships medalists
Figure skating commentators
Medalists at the 1992 Winter Olympics